Biwia zezera is a species of ray-finned fish in the genus Biwia found in Japan.

References

Biwia
Cyprinid fish of Asia
Fish of Japan
Fish described in 1895